Parker, Thomas and Rice and Parker & Thomas were architectural firms formed in the early 20th century by partners J. Harleston Parker, Douglas H. Thomas, and Arthur W. Rice. 

A number of their works are listed on the U.S. National Register of Historic Places, including:

as Parker & Thomas
Alex Brown Building (1901), 135 E. Baltimore St., Baltimore, Maryland (Parker & Thomas), NRHP-listed
Belvedere Hotel (1903), 1 E. Chase St., Baltimore, Maryland (Parker & Thomas), NRHP-listed
Baltimore & Ohio Railroad Building (1904-06), 2 North Charles Street. Baltimore, Maryland, with Herbert D. Hale and Henry G. Morse. Now the Hotel Monaco Baltimore.
Rosenfeld Building (1905), 32-42 S. Paca St., Baltimore, Maryland (Parker & Thomas), NRHP-listed
Stone House Hill House (1905), mansion of Frederick Lothrop Ames, Jr., later part of Stonehill College 
Fenway Studios (1905-06), 30 Ipswich St., Boston, Massachusetts (Parker & Thomas), NRHP-listed
U.S. Post Office and Courthouse (1905-07), 9th St. and 5th Ave., Huntington, West Virginia (Parker & Thomas), NRHP-listed
Finney Houses Historic District (1921), Glenville Rd. near jct. MD 155, Churchville, Maryland (Parker & Thomas), NRHP-listed

as Parker, Thomas & Rice
R. H. Stearns Building (1908-09), 140 Tremont St., Boston, Massachusetts (Parker, Thomas & Rice), NRHP-listed
Baltimore Gas and Electric Company Building (1916), 39 W. Lexington St., Baltimore, Maryland (Parker, Thomas and Rice), NRHP-listed
Raceland (1925 / 1931), Framingham, Massachusetts (Parker, Thomas and Rice)
United Shoe Machinery Corporation Building (1929), 138-164 Federal St., Boston, Massachusetts (Parker, Thomas & Rice), NRHP-listed

See also
First Presbyterian Church (1885), 471 Main St., Highlands, North Carolina (Parker, Thomas F.), NRHP-listed
Ellen D. Sharpe House (1912), Providence, Rhode Island (Parker, Thomas & Rice). Now Machado House, Brown University.

References

Architecture firms of the United States
Architecture firms based in Massachusetts